Kamla is a 1984 Hindi film produced and directed by Jagmohan Mundhra, starring Deepti Naval, Shabana Azmi, and Marc Zuber in lead roles. The film is titled after the character of Naval. The screenplay by Vijay Tendulkar was based on his play Kamala, written in 1981.

Plot

Jaisingh Jadav (Marc Zuber), a Delhi-based journalist finds that even to this date, the flesh trade exists in a village in Madhya Pradesh, the victims being girls belonging to the Bhil tribe. Like any avid journalist, he travels to the village, followed by really buying a girl named Kamla (Deepti Naval) and takes her to his home in Delhi. As his intentions were good, some days later he holds a press conference where he reveals the actual wrongdoings going on in the village.

Cast
 Deepti Naval as Kamla
 Shabana Azmi as Sarita Jadhav
 Marc Zuber as Jaisingh Jadhav
 A.K. Hangal as Kakasaab (Sarita's uncle)
 Sulabha Deshpande
 Tun Tun

Music
"Aaj Phir Aaine Se" - Salma Agha
"Insaano Ko Neelam Kare Duniya" - Pankaj Udhas
"Kaisa Yeh Karam" - Pankaj Udhas

Critical reception

Upon its release, Kamla received rave reviews. The Times of India in a review stated, "Deepti Naval is called to widen her eyes, tremble like a scared rabbit and drop pearly smiles. To her credit, she performs these chores competently." The Indian Express wrote, "Mundhara is to be complimented on getting two credible – perhaps notable – performances from Deepti Naval and Marc Zuber – whose talents have so far been pretty well concealed."

True Incident Inspiration
The movie is based on Tendulkar's play, which in turn is inspired by a real life expose by the journalist Ashwini Sarin, of The Indian Express. In the expose he actually bought a girl from the rural flesh market, from a village  of Dholpur, Rajsthan,  for an amount of Rs20000. He presented the woman at a press conference.

References

External links
 

1984 films
1984 drama films
1980s Hindi-language films
Indian drama films
Films about human trafficking in India
Films about women in India
Films set in Delhi
Atlantic Entertainment Group films
Films scored by Bappi Lahiri
1985 drama films
1985 films
Indian films based on plays
Hindi-language drama films
Films directed by Jag Mundhra